Efharis Petridou was the first female lawyer in Greece; in 1925 she joined the Athens Bar Association.

References

20th-century Greek lawyers
Greek women lawyers